The Glukhaya Vilva is a river in Perm Krai, Russia, a left tributary of the Yazva. It starts to the north of the uninhabited village of Talaya and flows through Solikamsky and Krasnovishersky districts. Its mouth is upstream of the settlement Kotomysh. There are many swamps near the river.

Main tributaries:
 Left: Tala, Bolshoy Kyrog, Bolshoy Surmog, Maly Surmog, Bolshaya Mysya;
 Right: Bolshoy Durakom, Bolshoy Sim, Dolgaya.

References

Rivers of Perm Krai